Michalis Alexandropoulos (born  in Kinshasa) is a retired Greek male indoor volleyball and beach volleyball player. As an indoor volleyball player, he played most notably for Olympiacos (2002–2005), with whom he won 1 Greek Championship (2002−03) and the 2005 CEV Top Teams Cup and for Aris Thessaloniki (1985–1992, 1993–1999, 2000–2002), with whom he won 1 Greek Championship (1996–97) and 1 Greek Super Cup (1997). Alexandropoulos had 16 caps with Greece men's national volleyball team.

As a beach volleyball player he has won 2 Greek Championships (2000 with teammate Ilias Arabatzis, 2004 with teammate Giorgos Koulieris).

References

External links
 interview at tovima.gr (in Greek)
 

1972 births
Living people
Aris V.C. players
Iraklis V.C. players
Greek men's volleyball players
Greek beach volleyball players
Olympiacos S.C. players
PAOK V.C. players